Myall is a locality in the local government area of the Shire of Buloke, Victoria, Australia.  It had a post office that was opened on 24 March 1891, then it was closed on 20 June 1965.

References